Lichuan County is a county in the east of Jiangxi province, China, bordering Fujian province to the east. It is under the jurisdiction of the prefecture-level city of Fuzhou.

Administrative divisions
In the present, Lichuan County has 6 towns and 8 townships.
6 towns

8 townships

Demographics 

Climate

Education
Jigao Primary School (极高小学) is located in Xiongcun Town (熊村镇). Since September 2019 the school, as of December 2020, has a single student.

Notes and references

External links 
  Government site - 

County-level divisions of Jiangxi
Fuzhou, Jiangxi